Naflocort (developmental code name SQ-26490) is a synthetic glucocorticoid corticosteroid which was never marketed.

References

Diketones
Diols
Organofluorides
Glucocorticoids
Tetralins
Pregnanes
Abandoned drugs